The 1943 Morgan State Bears football team was an American football team that represented Morgan State College in the Colored Intercollegiate Athletic Association (CIAA) during the 1943 college football season. In their 15th season under head coach Edward P. Hurt, the Bears compiled a 5–0 record, won the CIAA championship, shut out five of seven opponents, did not allow opponents to score a points, and outscored all opponents by a total of 166 to 0. The Bears were recognized as the 1943 black college national champion.

Schedule

References

Morgan State
Morgan State Bears football seasons
College football undefeated seasons
Black college football national champions
Morgan State Bears football